Jo Yeong-wook (occasionally romanized as Cho Young-wuk: born January 1, 1962) is a South Korean film music supervisor. He is most widely known for his collaborations with director Park Chan-wook.

Filmography

Film 
The Contact (1997)
The Quiet Family (1998)
If the Sun Rises in the West (1998)
Tell Me Something (1999)
Happy End (1999)
Bloody Beach (2000)
Joint Security Area (2000)
A Day (2001)
Public Enemy (2002)
Ardor (2002)
The Classic (2003)
Oldboy (2003)
Silmido (2003)
If You Were Me (2003)
Too Beautiful to Lie (2004)
Some (2004)
Lovely Rivals (2004)
Flying Boys (2004)
Blood Rain (2005)
Sympathy for Lady Vengeance (2005) (also credited as producer)
A Dirty Carnival (2006)
Traces of Love (2006)
I'm a Cyborg, But That's OK (2006)
Miss Gold Digger (2007)
Out of My Intention (short film, 2008)
Public Enemy Returns (2008)
Thirst (2009)
White Night (2009)
Invitation (short film, 2009)
Seoul (2010) 
Moss (2010)
The Unjust (2010)
Interview with the Vampire (short film, 2010)
Mirror, Mirror (short film, 2010)
GLove (2011)
Q&A (short film in If You Were Me 5, 2011)
The Client (2011)
Pandora (short film, 2011)
Nameless Gangster: Rules of the Time (2012)
Hand in Hand (2012)
The Concubine (2012)
Deranged (2012)
The Spies (2012)
The Berlin File (2013)
New World (2013)
Fists of Legend (2013)
Mai Ratima (2013)
Hide and Seek (2013)
Tough as Iron (2013) 
The Attorney (2013)
Mad Sad Bad (2014)
Kundo: Age of the Rampant (2014)
The Shameless (2015)
Minority Opinion (2015)
The Beauty Inside (2015)
The Handmaiden (2016)
Pandora (2016)
A Taxi Driver (2017)
The Spy Gone North (2018)
Mal-Mo-E: The Secret Mission (2019)
The Man Standing Next (2020)
Cliff Walkers (2021)
Decision to Leave (2022)

Television 
The Little Drummer Girl (2018)
Narco-Saints (2022)

Awards
2003 2nd Korean Film Awards: Best Music (The Classic)
2004 41st Grand Bell Awards: Best Music (Oldboy)
2004 3rd Korean Film Awards: Best Music (Oldboy)
2009 30th Blue Dragon Film Awards: Best Music (Thirst)
2012 33rd Blue Dragon Film Awards: Best Music (Nameless Gangster: Rules of the Time)
2013 22nd Buil Film Awards: Best Music (The Berlin File)
2013 50th Grand Bell Awards: Best Music (New World)
2014 23rd Buil Film Awards: Best Music (Kundo: Age of the Rampant)
2014 34th Korean Association of Film Critics Awards: Best Music (Kundo: Age of the Rampant)
2014 35th Blue Dragon Film Awards: Best Music (Kundo: Age of the Rampant)
2014 1st Korean Film Producers Association Awards: Best Music (Kundo: Age of the Rampant)
2015 24th Buil Film Awards: Best Music (The Shameless)
2017 38th Blue Dragon Film Awards: Best Music (A Taxi Driver)

References

External links
 Jo Yeong-wook on Last.fm
 
 
 

Living people
1962 births
Music directors